Kolkata is a city in West Bengal, India, formerly called Calcutta

Kolkata may also refer to:

Places
 Port of Kolkata
 Kolkata district
 Kolkata Metropolitan Area
 Civic administration of Kolkata
 Kolkata Municipal Corporation
 North Kolkata
 Kolkata West International City
 East Kolkata Wetlands

Constituencies
 Kolkata Port (Vidhan Sabha constituency)
 Kolkata Uttar (Lok Sabha constituency), Calcutta North
 Kolkata Dakshin (Lok Sabha constituency), Calcutta South

Other uses
  Asia/Kolkata, the Kolkata time zone
 Kolkata railway station
 , warship of the Indian Navy
 Kolkata-class destroyer of the Indian Navy
 Kolkata TV, 24hr Bengali TV news channel

See also
 Calcutta (disambiguation)
 
 

Disambiguation pages